Isabella is a populated place situated in West Nantmeal Township in Chester County, Pennsylvania, United States.

History
The community took its name from the nearby Isabella Furnace.

References

Populated places in Chester County, Pennsylvania